The Vuelta a Venezuela is a men's multi-day road cycling race held annually in Venezuela.  The race carries a UCI rating of 2.2 and is part of the UCI America Tour, which is one of six UCI Continental Circuits sponsored by the Union Cycliste Internationale, the sport's international governing body. The event is organized by the Federacion Venezolana de Ciclismo.

Past winners

See also
Venezuelan National Road Race Championships

References

External links

 
Cycle races in Venezuela
UCI America Tour races
Recurring sporting events established in 1963
1963 establishments in Venezuela
Annual sporting events in Venezuela